A bridge plate, or bridgeplate, is a mechanical, movable form of wheelchair ramp that is used on some low-floor light rail vehicles (LRVs) to provide for wheelchair access. The bridge plate extends from the vehicle to the platform, which must be raised to close to the level of the floor of the vehicle so that the wheelchair need not travel over an excessively steep ramp (in the United States, the Americans with Disabilities Act specifies that the slope must be no more than 1 inch of rise for every 12 inches of length).  Some low-floor buses also use bridge plates (in this case, extending to the curb) to provide for wheelchair access, but many low-floor buses instead use a ramp that normally serves as part of the floor but can be flipped out through the door (using a hinge at the door) onto the curb or street; in this case the ramp is long enough that it can serve as a true wheelchair ramp rather than a bridge without being excessively steep.

Bridge plates can be manually deployed (by the vehicle operator or other crew person) or powered, rectractable ramps.  The first passenger rail cars in North America to be equipped with retractable bridge plates were TriMet's (Portland, Oregon) Siemens SD660 LRVs, the first of which were completed in 1996. Earlier, in 1987, the newly opened Sacramento RT Light Rail system used non-powered, station-platform-mounted bridge plates to bridge the gap between a high-platform section at each station and the floor of an LRV.

Manually operated bridge plates 

On some railway stations in France and the United Kingdom, it may not be possible provide permanent level access from the platform to the train if different types of trains pass through or serve the station. To overcome this issue, a station may have one or more staff-operated boarding ramp on the platforms, to be deployed when a wheelchair user boards the train.

Bridge plates across tracks 

Much larger bridge plates, spanning across tracks, are used for boarding when the track next to the platform is closed, especially for maintenance. These plates can be dangerous, as the section of track must be taken out of service and trains rerouted to avoid colliding with the plates.

See also
 Wheelchair lift
 Wheelchair ramp

References

Mobility devices
Public transport
Passenger rail transport